Dialogues is an album by guitarist Carlos Paredes and bassist Charlie Haden recorded in 1990 and released on the Antilles label.

Reception
The Allmusic review by Richard S. Ginell awarded the album 3 stars, stating, "Even for the adventurous Charlie Haden, this encounter with the Portuguese guitarist Carlos Paredes is pretty unusual... World music fans thus will probably find it easier going than the average jazz browser".

Track listing
All compositions by Carlos Parades except as indicated
 "Asas Sobre O Mundo/Nas Asas da Saudade" - 3:02 
 "Dança Dos Camponeses" - 2:35 
 "Canto de Trabalho" - 9:22 
 "Marionetas" - 2:38 
 "Song for Ché" (Charlie Haden) - 7:15 
 "Balada de Coimbra" (Elyseu) - 2:38 
 "Divertimento" - 2:39 
 "Variações Sobre O Fado de Artur Paredes I de Conçalo" (Artur Paredes, Gonçalo Paredes) - 2:52 
 "Verdes Anos" - 14:08 
Recorded at Studio Acousti in Paris, France, on January 28 and 29, 1990

Personnel 
Carlos Paredes — Portuguese guitar
Charlie Haden — bass

References 

Antilles Records albums
Charlie Haden albums
1990 albums